Mermaid Records is a Copenhagen, Denmark based record label, and a sublabel of Sony Music Entertainment Denmark. The company was started as an independent record label by Mik Christensen and Nick Foss in 2005. The label publishes distinguished Danish artists.

History 
In 2004, several key figures from EMI-Medley left the label and started Copenhagen Records to give artists more artistic freedom. Among them were Christensen and Foss, who started Mermaid Records in 2005, but remained with Copenhagen Records until 2008. Since 2008, the label is largely owned by Sony Music Entertainment Denmark to create more space for Danish music. The first album released after Sony became the main shareholder was Tim Christensen's third solo album, Superior.

Artists 

 Big Fat Snake
 Bikstok Røgsystem
 D-A-D
 Brinck
 Clemens
 Diamonds For Eyes
 Electric Lady Lab
 Rasmus Nøhr
 Sanne Salomonsen
 Hannah Schneider
 Sko/Torp
 Tim Christensen
 Turboweekend

See also 
 List of record labels

References

External links 
 Mermaid Records on the Sony Music Denmark website
 Mermaid Records on MySpace

Danish independent record labels
Record labels established in 2005
Sony Music